Nani Bregvadze (Ge. ნანი ბრეგვაძე, Rus. Нани Брегвадзе; born 21 July 1936, in Tbilisi) is a Georgian and Soviet singer, pianist, music pedagogue, people's artist of the USSR (1983).
She was born, raised and started her career in Soviet Georgia in the USSR, then gained USSR-wide popularity during 1957 6th World Festival of Youth and Students. Bregvadze has performed with Georgian music group VIA Orera and as a solo artist.

Bregvadze's signature songs include Snegopad ("Snowfall"), Bolshak (later covered by Alla Pugacheva), and Dorogoi Dlinnoyu (adapted in English as Those Were the Days). After launching a successful solo career in the early 1970s, Bregvadze performed a great number of Russian and Gypsy romances. She was named a People's Artist of the USSR in 1983. As of 2007, Bregvadze lived in Moscow and held the chair in popular and jazz music at the Moscow State Art and Cultural University. She has been an honorary citizen of Tbilisi since 1995.

References 

20th-century women singers from Georgia (country)
People's Artists of the USSR
Tbilisi State Conservatoire alumni
Musicians from Tbilisi
1936 births
Living people

Recipients of the Presidential Order of Excellence
Academic staff of Moscow State Art and Cultural University